Filippo Giudice Caracciolo was an Italian prelate who was archbishop of Naples from 1833 to 1844.

Life 
Born into a noble family in Naples on 27 March 1785, he entered the Oratorian order in the late years of the 18th century. He was ordained on March 18, 1809. He performed his pastoral duties in different places and in 1820 he was named bishop of Molfetta and consecrated as bishop. In 1833, he was named by pope Gregory XVI archbishop of Naples. In the same year he was named Cardinal with the title of S. Agnese fuori le mura. He died on 29 January 1844.

References 

1785 births
1844 deaths
19th-century Italian cardinals
19th-century Italian Roman Catholic archbishops
Archbishops of Naples
Filippo
Cardinals created by Pope Gregory XVI